Il talismano della felicità (The Talisman of Happiness in English), written by magazine editor Ada Boni, is a well-known Italian cookbook originally published in 1929.  It is believed to be the first Italian cookbook specifically targeted to housewives, and along with the work of Pellegrino Artusi and Editoriale Domus' Il cucchiaio d'argento is considered one of the defining recipe and cooking-advice collections in Italian cuisine. It soon turned into a staple for generations of Italian women. The standard edition is 1054 pages long and was last reissued in 1999; it was also available in an abridged version known as Il piccolo Talismano from the same publisher. When it was first published in 1928, it contained about 882 recipes; subsequent editions contained more than 2000 recipes. 

An abridged translation, by Matilde La Rosa, who added some "American-style" Italian recipes, with an introduction and glossary by Romance linguist Mario Pei, was published in 1950 as The Talisman Italian Cookbook: Italy's Bestselling Cookbook Adapted for American Kitchens (Crown/Random House, 1950). La Rosa and Pei decided to leave out recipes that were not of Italian origin for the American edition, and also added a few Italian-American recipes that were felt at the time to be necessary in an Italian cookbook. The La Rosa translation is now out of print.

References

See also

Italian cuisine

Italian cookbooks
1929 non-fiction books